The battle of Goumakoura took place during the Tuareg rebellion of 2012. On February 24, 2012, a military camp of the Malian army was attacked by the MNLA. The attack was however repelled.

The battle
On February 24, the MNLA attacked the military camp of Goumakoura, located in  Ségou. According to the separatists, the clashes started at 6 am and were over between 12 and 1 pm. 

The MNLA claimed that it launched this attack outside its claimed territory in retaliation for the bombing near Anefis of a Marabout tribe of the Kal-Assouk committed by Ukrainian mercenaries in the service of the Malian army. According to the MNLA, between one and four people were killed by this bombing and 13 injured, mostly elderly people, women and children. According to Médecins sans Frontières, which cared for the wounded with a team from the Malian Ministry of Health, one  girl was fatally wounded in the bombing and 10 people were wounded, including nine women and children and three seriously. 

The MNLA was reportedly led by two deserters from the Malian army, Colonel Bouna and Akli, former commander of Goumankoura. Their forces include two brigades. According to the Malian army, reinforcements, commanded by Colonel Takini and from Ségou, routed the attackers. Both sides claimed the victory, however the ground remained to the Malian soldiers.

References

2012 in Mali
Conflicts in 2012
Tinzaouaten
February 2012 events in Africa
Battles in 2012